P. reticulatum may refer to:

Pentabrachion reticulatum, a flowering plant species
Phragmipedium reticulatum, an orchid species
Propilidium reticulatum, a sea snail species
Pseuderanthemum reticulatum, a synonym of Pseuderanthemum maculatum, a shrub species
Pseudoplatystoma reticulatum, a catfish species
Pterospermum reticulatum, a flowering plant species